Alexandra Panova and Heather Watson were the defending champions, but Watson chose not to participate. Panova successfully defended the title alongside Margarita Gasparyan, defeating Vitalia Diatchenko and Olga Savchuk in the final, 6–3, 7–5.

Seeds

Draw

References 
 Draw

Baku Cup - Doubles
2015